Breaking with Old Ideas is a 1975 Chinese film directed by Li Wenhua. The film is one of the few that were produced during the Cultural Revolution. As a result of the political upheaval taking place, Breaking with Old Ideas's plot was heavily regulated under highly codified guidelines on story and characterization so that it would have a mass character, as opposed to an individual focused character, namely proletarian politics as opposed to bourgeois politics. The film draws inspiration from issues with schooling in China at the time, such as that there was too much study, and too little social practice.

Plot
In 1958, the Communist Party of China sends Long Guozheng (Guo Zhenqing), a graduate of the Counter-Japanese Military and Political University, to head the newly established Jiangxi Communist Labour University (today's Jiangxi Agricultural University). The school's more capitalist elements, such as aiming for high bourgeois academic standards, and refusal to admit poorly-educated (according to bourgeois standards) peasants clash with Long's more communistic approach. He advocates only admitting students from the working class, and begins innovative changes—to the dismay of many other staff—such as putting more emphasis on hard labor than classroom learning, switching courses to accommodate experiential learning, removing impractical sections from the curriculum, holding lessons in the field, and excusing students who miss exams to work for the commune. Later, a student, Li Jinfeng (Wang Suya), whom Long considers an exemplary follower of the "educational revolution", faces expulsion and is put on trial. The masses come out in support of her and denounce those taking the capitalist line on education. Those in power taking the capitalist line decide to shut down the college as a result. In the end, the college is saved by the will of the peasants and a pronouncement from Chairman Mao himself.

Cast 
Guo Zhenqing as Long Guozheng
Wang Suya as Li Jinfeng
Wen Xiying as Deputy Secretary Tang
Xu Zhan as Xu Niuzai
Zhang Zheng as Old Representative
Li Shijiang as Jiang Danian
Hou Guanqun as Yu Gang
Xiang Hong as Cao Xiaomei
Wu Jing as Xiao Ping

References

External links 

1975 films
Chinese drama films
1975 drama films
1970s Mandarin-language films
Maoist China propaganda films
Films shot in Jiangxi
Beijing Film Studio films
Films set in the 1950s
Films set in the 1960s
Chinese propaganda films
Films about the Cultural Revolution